Louis Belpedio (born May 14, 1996) is an American professional ice hockey defenseman currently playing with the Lehigh Valley Phantoms in the American Hockey League (AHL) as a prospect for the Philadelphia Flyers of the National Hockey League (NHL). He was selected by the Minnesota Wild, 80th overall, in the 2014 NHL Entry Draft.

Playing career
Belpedio played midget hockey within the Culver Military Academy in Indiana. He continued his development playing within the USA Hockey National Team Development Program in the United States Hockey League.

Upon completing a four-year collegiate career with Miami University (Ohio) in the 2017–18 campaign, Belpedio initially joined the Wild's AHL affiliate, the Iowa Wild on an amateur try-out contract on March 16, 2018.

After 10 games with Iowa, Belpedio signed a two-year, entry-level contract with draft club, the Minnesota Wild on April 5, 2018. He joined the playoff bound Wild roster and made his NHL debut, recording two assists and becoming the first player in Wild history to record a multi-point game in his NHL debut, in a season finale 6–3 victory over the San Jose Sharks on April 7, 2018. Belpedio remained on the roster through the Wilds' first round playoff exit, without featuring in a game.

Belpedio remained with the Wild for four seasons before leaving as a free agent and signing a one-year, two-way contract with the Montreal Canadiens on July 28, 2021.

On July 13, 2022, Belpedio was signed as a free agent to a one-year, two-way contract with the Philadelphia Flyers.

Career statistics

Regular season and playoffs

International

Awards and honors

References

External links
 

1996 births
Living people
American men's ice hockey defensemen
Culver Academies alumni
Iowa Wild players
Ice hockey players from Illinois
Laval Rocket players
Lehigh Valley Phantoms players
Miami RedHawks men's ice hockey players
Minnesota Wild draft picks
Minnesota Wild players
USA Hockey National Team Development Program players